Karalo Hepoiteloto Maibuca Junior (born 10 June 1999) is a Tuvaluan sprinter. He is the son of Ratu Karalo Maibuca Senior, a Fijian, and a mother from Kioa. He was selected to compete at the 2020 Summer Olympics and was given the honour of being the flag bearer for his nation in the opening ceremony alongside Matie Stanley. In the preliminary round of the 100 metres he ran a Tuvaluan national record time of 11.42 seconds, but did not qualify to the next round.

He represented Tuvalu at the Gold Coast XXI Commonwealth Games in 2018 and the Birmingham XXII Commonwealth Games in 2022.

References

External links
 

1999 births
Living people
Athletes (track and field) at the 2020 Summer Olympics
Olympic athletes of Tuvalu
Tuvaluan male sprinters
Commonwealth Games competitors for Tuvalu
Athletes (track and field) at the 2018 Commonwealth Games
People from Nanumanga
Athletes (track and field) at the 2022 Commonwealth Games